Gordon Head Baseball Association, located in the municipality of Saanich, just north of Victoria, British Columbia, provides a comprehensive baseball program for players from four to 100 years old, in eight separate divisions, including Blastball, Initiation, Novice, Mosquito, Pee Wee, Bantam, Midget and Junior Men's. Known as Gordon Head Little League from 1957 through 2002, when it became affiliated with Baseball B.C., Gordon Head Baseball Association incorporated Lambrick Park Baseball in 2012. The organization is a member of the British Columbia Minor Baseball Association (BCMBA) and, under the jurisdiction of the Greater Victoria Baseball Association (GVBA), plays locally in Lambrick Park. The current president is Steve Gaskin, and the chief umpire is Barry Whelan.

History
 2010 Pee Wee AA Black Sox - Carnarvon Blast tournament champions
 2009 Mosquito "A" (Rebels), Island champions (seven players); Mosquito "AAA" (Venom), Island champions (one player)
 2007 Pee Wee "A" (Tigers), Island silver medallists, provincial champions (nine players); Pee Wee "A" (Cougars), Island champions, provincial silver medallists (two players); Pee Wee "AAA" national bronze medallist (one player); Mosquito "AAA" Tier II (Raiders), provincial bronze medallists (six players); Mosquito "A" (Rebels), Island champions
 2006 Pee Wee "AAA" national silver medallists (three players); Pee Wee "A" (Tigers), Island champions (one player); Pee Wee "A" (Cougars), provincial bronze medallists (three players); Mosquito "AAA" Tier 1 provincial silver medallists (seven players); Mosquito "AAA" Tier 2 Island silver medallists (six players)
 2005 Pee Wee "A" Island champions, 3rd at Provincials (nine players); Mosquito "AAA" Island champions, 4th at Provincials (seven players)
 2004 Mosquito "A" provincial champions (six players)
 2002 Pee Wee "A" provincial champions (three players)
 2001 Little League Canadian runners-up, provincial champions, 10-year-olds zone winners
 2000 Little League provincial champions
 1999 Little League provincial and Canadian champions
 1978 Little League Island champions and provincial runners-up

Distinguished Alumni
Michael Saunders
Steve Nash
Martin Nash (soccer)
Jeff Mallett
Daryn Lansdell (Drafted 1986 by Philadelphia Phillies)
Drew Farrell

References

External links
Gordon Head Baseball Association
Greater Victoria Baseball Association
British Columbia Minor Baseball Association

Sport in Victoria, British Columbia
Youth sport in Canada
Baseball in British Columbia